Fatmir Limaj (born 4 February 1971), is a Kosovo-Albanian politician. He is the leader of Nisma për Kosovën. Limaj served as Minister of Transport and Telecommunication in the government of the Republic of Kosovo. He was known as "Çeliku" during the Yugoslav wars.

Biography
Limaj was born in the village of Banjë, in the municipality of Suva Reka, Kosovo. During the 1999 Kosovo War, Limaj was a commander of the Kosovo Liberation Army (KLA), in the Lapušnik area. His alias was Çeliku. 

After the war he was one of the founders of what is now Kosovo's largest political party, the Democratic Party of Kosovo. After his indictment, which he was freed from in 2007 (see below), he returned to politics. From 2007 to 2010, he served as the Minister of Transport.

In the elections held in December 2010 he was third most voted leader in the whole country but he decided not to be part of the government. In 2014, he co-founded the Initiative for Kosovo Party (NISMA).

Fatmir was Deputy Prime Minister of Kosovo in the cabinet of Ramush Haradinaj from September 2017 to February 2020.

War crimes charges
Limaj was arrested on 18 February 2003, in Slovenia. The International Criminal Tribunal for the former Yugoslavia (ICTY) charged him, Isak Musliu and Haradin Bala with war crimes against Serbs and Albanians regarding illegal imprisonment, cruel treatment, inhuman acts, and murders in Lapušnik prison camp. 

On 4 March 2003, he was sent to The Hague, and on 15 November 2004, the trial began. In November 2005, Limaj was acquitted by the ICTY.  

In September 2007, The Appeals Chamber found that "the Trial Chamber reasonably found that Fatmir Limaj does not incur criminal responsibility for any of the offences charged in the indictment," Judge Fausto Pocar said.

Limaj was charged in another war crime case by European Union Rule of Law Mission in Kosovo (EULEX). He was held for seven months in house arrest and on 21 March the Court declared all statements of witness X as inadmissible whilst the whole indictment was based on those statements. Hours after that Limaj was released with the court order.

Limaj was found not guilty by an international court in 2018 for the murder of two Albanians during the separatist war.

Notes and references
Notes:

References:

1971 births
Albanian nationalists in Kosovo
Living people
Deputy Prime Ministers of Kosovo
People from Mališevo
Kosovo Albanians
People acquitted by the International Criminal Tribunal for the former Yugoslavia
Kosovo Liberation Army soldiers